Rockingham County Courthouse is a historic county courthouse located at Harrisonburg, Virginia. It was designed by T.J. Collins (1844–1925) and built in 1896–1897.  The courthouse is a 3 1/2-story building of coursed rusticated ashlar above a raised basement.  It has a tile covered hipped roof with a molded cornice with dentilwork above a plain frieze. The building has elements of the Richardsonian Romanesque and Romanesque Revival styles.  It has a projecting central pavilion with a two-stage clock tower.  Fronting the pavilion is a triple arched portico on the first story formed by slender columns set on square pedestals with a heavy stone balustrade above.  It is the fifth courthouse to stand on the site since Rockingham was formed from Augusta County, Virginia in 1778.

It was listed on the National Register of Historic Places in 1982.

References

County courthouses in Virginia
Courthouses on the National Register of Historic Places in Virginia
Romanesque Revival architecture in Virginia
Government buildings completed in 1897
Buildings and structures in Harrisonburg, Virginia
National Register of Historic Places in Harrisonburg, Virginia